Emanuel Tolbert (born December 2, 1958) is a former American college and professional football player who was a slotback and wide receiver in the Canadian Football League (CFL) for eleven seasons during the 1980s and early 1990s.  Tolbert played college football for Southern Methodist University, where he was an All-American. He played professionally for the Saskatchewan Roughriders, Toronto Argonauts, Calgary Stampeders and British Columbia Lions of the CFL, and played a key role in the Argonauts' 1983 Grey Cup victory by recovering a fumble on the game-winning drive.

Tolbert was tried for and convicted of rape and violating a minor in 2001.  He was sentenced to 15 years in prison for the rape plus four years for the violation, to be served concurrently.

References

1958 births
Living people
Sportspeople from Little Rock, Arkansas
All-American college football players
American players of Canadian football
BC Lions players
Calgary Stampeders players
Canadian football slotbacks
Canadian football wide receivers
Saskatchewan Roughriders players
SMU Mustangs football players
Toronto Argonauts players
American football wide receivers
Players of American football from Arkansas
American people convicted of rape
American sportspeople convicted of crimes
Prisoners and detainees of Arkansas
Criminals from Arkansas
American prisoners and detainees